Ken Whitfield (1930 – 1995) was a footballer who played as a centre half in the Football League for Wolverhampton Wanderers, Manchester City, Brighton & Hove Albion and Queens Park Rangers.

References

Manchester City F.C. players
1930 births
1995 deaths
People from Spennymoor
Footballers from County Durham
English footballers
Association football central defenders
Shildon A.F.C. players
Wolverhampton Wanderers F.C. players
Brighton & Hove Albion F.C. players
Queens Park Rangers F.C. players
English Football League players
English football managers
Bideford A.F.C. players